Marshall McDiarmid Williams (February 21, 1893 – February 22, 1935) nicknamed "Cap", was a pitcher in Major League Baseball. He played for the Philadelphia Athletics in 1916.

References

External links

1893 births
1935 deaths
Major League Baseball pitchers
Philadelphia Athletics players
Baseball players from North Carolina
People from Faison, North Carolina